The Glenn L. Martin Maryland Aviation Museum is located at Martin State Airport in Middle River, Maryland. It educates visitors through the use of exhibits, artifacts, archival materials and stories about aviation in Maryland over the last hundred years, with an emphasis on the Glenn L. Martin Company and the more recent Lockheed Martin histories.

The aircraft currently on display are on loan from the Navy and Army, with the exception of the Martin 4-0-4, which was donated to the museum in 1999. The museum also hosts periodic open cockpit days featuring three or four selected aircraft. The history of the Martin Corporation is told with displays of models, films,  photographs and documents from the museum's large archive. There is a research library, through which this archive can be examined on appointment. The museum relies on volunteers who run the museum and assist the visitors with admissions, store purchases, and tours. They also help with visiting school groups, other educational projects and aircraft restorations.

History 

Glenn L. Martin flew his first glider in 1907 and his own design of pusher configuration  biplane on 1909. He founded the Glenn L. Martin Company in 1911. When this was merged into the Wright-Martin corporation in 1917, he set up a new company, based in Cleveland, with the original name. In 1928 it moved to Baltimore, where Martin bought over 1,260 acres in the suburb of Middle River and built some of the most modern aircraft manufacturing plants of its time. Huge facilities sprang up including an airport (with hangars and terminal) and several communities that still exist.

Between the years 1911 and 1960, the Glenn L. Martin Company produced over 80 different types of aircraft totaling more than 11,000 planes, including dozens of Boeing B-29s (50 of which were the "Atomic Bombers" including Enola Gay and Bockscar).

In 1960 the company abandoned aircraft design, changed its name to The Martin Corporation and produced missiles like the Titan missile series. From 1965, as the Martin Marietta Corporation, it produced lifting bodies.

The museum was founded in 1990 and opened at Martin State Airport in 1993.

Collection 

The following aircraft are in the museum's collection.

 Beechcraft 18S
 Beechcraft T-34C Mentor
 Bell UH-1M Iroquois
 Douglas TA-4J Skyhawk
 Forney F-1
 Lockheed T-33
 LTV A-7D Corsair II
 North American F-100F Super Sabre
 North American F-100F Super Sabre
 Martin 4-0-4
 Martin RB-57A Canberra
 Martin RB-57A Canberra
 McDonnell Douglas F-4C Phantom II
 McDonnell F-101B Voodoo
 Republic RF-84F Thunderflash
 Republic F-105G Thunderchief

Other aircraft and exhibits in storage and not available for viewing are:
 Grumman F-9F Cougar
 Aft fuselage and tail of a Martin P6M SeaMaster jet flying boat
 Two Martin AM Mauler aircraft under restoration

See also 
 List of aerospace museums

References

External links 

 
 Martin State Airport
 175th Wing Maryland Air National Guard

Aerospace museums in Maryland
Aviation in Maryland
Museums in Baltimore County, Maryland